Varanus douarrha, the New Ireland monitor,  is a species of lizard of the Varanidae family. It is found on New Ireland in Papua New Guinea.

References

Varanus
Reptiles described in 1830
Reptiles of Papua New Guinea
Taxa named by René Lesson